Micarta is a brand name for composites of linen, canvas, paper, fiberglass, carbon fiber, or other fabric in a thermosetting plastic. It was originally used in electrical and decorative applications. Micarta was developed by George Westinghouse at least as early as 1910 using phenolic resins invented by Leo Baekeland. These resins were used to impregnate paper and cotton fabric which were cured under pressure and high temperature to produce laminates. In later years this manufacturing method included the use of fiberglass fabric, and other resin types were also used. Today Micarta high-pressure industrial laminates are produced with a wide variety of resins and fibers.  The term has been used generically for most resin impregnated fiber compounds. Common uses of modern high-pressure laminates include electrical insulators, printed circuit board substrates, and knife handles.

The Micarta trademark is a registered trademark of Industrial Laminates / Norplex, Inc. (dba Norplex-Micarta), but as with many trademarks, it is often used generically for similar products from other producers, as well as homemade products.

Manufacturing process 

Micarta industrial laminates are normally phenolic, epoxy, silicone, or melamine resin based thermoset materials reinforced with fiberglass, cork, cotton cloth, paper, carbon fiber or other substrates. Micarta industrial laminate sheet is a hard, dense material made by applying heat and pressure to layers of prepreg. These layers of lamination usually consist of cellulose paper, cotton fabrics, synthetic yarn fabrics, glass fabrics, or unwoven fabrics. When heat and pressure are applied to the layers, a chemical reaction (polymerization) transforms the layers into a high-pressure thermosetting industrial laminated plastic.

Micarta industrial laminates are manufactured in dozens of commercial grades.

Applications 

The largest use for Micarta industrial laminates is a high strength electrical insulation in power generating and distribution equipment. Laminates are also used in heavy equipment, aerospace (such as propeller blades); automotive parts; office equipment; tabletops and countertops; electronics; electrical insulation between pressure vessels or piping and their supports; handles such as those of knives, BBQ and kitchen tools as well as handgun grips; guitar fingerboards, nuts and bridges; pool cues; and safety gear such as hard hats.  Between 1935 and 1945, Westinghouse's Power-Aire desk fans used blades made of Micarta.

Micarta 259-2 was used as the ablation heat shield material in early ICBM warheads.

Ownership 
Micarta's industrial laminate division and name were purchased by Norplex in 2003, merging two of the largest industrial laminate manufactures in the United States. Norplex still manufactures Micarta and produces over 100 different versions of Micarta offered in sheet, tube, and rod forms.

See also 
 Composite epoxy material
 FR-4, epoxy-fiberglass PC board laminate for printed circuit boards, which has largely replaced micarta for the purpose.
 G10

References 

 American Machinist (Trade Journal): Micarta is a new insulating material developed by Westinghouse, American Machinist, New York, NY, United States, Thursday, July 17, 1913, vol. 39, no. 3, p. 122, col. 1-2

External links 
 Norplex-Micarta Industrial Composites

Composite materials